Calvert Road is a designated state route in the Northern Territory of Australia. Forming part of State Route 16, it connects Highway 1 on a joint section of the Savannah Way and Carpentaria Highway near Calvert Hills with the Tablelands Highway near Cresswell Downs.

See also

References

Roads in the Northern Territory